Continuation of the Séminaire Nicolas Bourbaki programme, for the 1950s.

1950/51 series

1951/52

1952/53

1953/54

1954/55

1955/56

1956/57

1957/58

1958/59

1959/60

External links
Source list